Oom Yung Doe (음양도; 陰陽道) is a line of Korean martial arts schools founded by John C. Kim (Grandmaster "Iron" Kim). In addition to teaching a broad range of physical movements and self-defense, the training also incorporates meditation, philosophy, and the use of herbal formulas and equipment. Some students describe substantial benefits including self-defense skills, mental and physical health, and improvements in conditions such as asthma, diabetes, rheumatoid arthritis, and blood pressure. Critics, however, accuse the school's founder and instructors of unethical behavior, charging large fees, and pressuring students to commit to long-term contracts. Beginning in the late 1980s, several TV and newspaper reports publicized these accusations, and described the school as a "cult." Kim and four of the organization's instructors were found guilty of conspiracy to commit tax fraud in 1995. Despite those issues, certain benefits of the training such as increased lung capacity and the healing of treatment-resistant back pain have been demonstrated to be effective in clinical settings; and there have also been several news reports publicizing some of the benefits described by the students.

Lineage and history of Oom Yung Doe
Oom Yung Doe represents itself as a synthesis of several martial arts styles, but primarily a line of traditional Chinese martial arts known as Yin Yang Dao ("Oom Yung" is Korean for "Yin Yang"). While the early history of Yin Yang Doe is not provided in detail, Oom Yung Doe literature describes a legend indicating that the first generation Grandmaster in this line was an individual named "Bagwa" who developed the style of martial arts known as Bagwa or Bāguàzhǎng (all this despite the fact that "bagwa" [八卦 - hanja representing the eight divinatory trigrams] is pronounced "palgwe" [팔괘] in Korean). The legend holds that Bagwa was born in a remote province of China around 1,500 years ago and taught his unique style of martial arts to the military, royalty, and prominent citizens. No information is reported with regard to the second through sixth generation grandmasters; however, Thomas White, a practitioner of Moo Doe martial arts, lists the seventh generation Grandmaster as "Wang Po."
White reports that Grandmaster "Iron" Kim received the title of Grandmaster in 1974.

Kim emigrated to the United States in the early 1970s, and opened his first American school of martial arts in 1973, teaching Kong Su in Westmont, IL. In 1976, John C. Kim began operating a line of martial arts schools called "Chung Moo Quan" (충무권), teaching the same 8 martial arts styles that are taught in modern Oom Yung Doe schools. "Chung Moo Quan" was effectively renamed to "Chung Moo Doe" (충무도) in 1989, and again to "Oom Yung Doe" in 1999; the instructor corps and training techniques for the three schools have been similar, and they have all been headed by John C. Kim.

Training
Oom Yung Doe practitioners describe the techniques taught within the school as "moo doe." Moo doe is generally translated as "martial arts," but within the school the original term is used to contrast Oom Yung Doe's techniques against "common martial arts" or "fabricated movement" which is more commonly taught in the United States. In common martial arts, students learn "general sequences of movements; movements that are basically the same for everyone. In this case the student/practitioner can truly only 'copy' the movement and cannot truly absorb and make it 'one' with their mind and body."

In contrast, moo doe movement / technique must match the individual. Each person is unique and therefore needs training that matches by them. The main line of Oom Yung Doe training is directed by a traditional master (not a school instructor, but a 9th degree international master who is required to clearly demonstrate their skill and ability). Because the master is able to "fit" the movement to the individual, each student/practitioner can fully absorb the movement.

Training is adjusted to fit the individual student, allowing even older individuals or individuals with injuries or conditions such as arthritis to participate. In fact, instructors claim (and some students have reported) that Oom Yung Doe training can help older or disabled individuals dramatically improve their condition.

Some of the main goals of practicing moo doe are said to be:
 To develop skill and ability (speed, strength, timing, flexibility, and coordination)
 To bring the mind, body, and movement together as one
 To bring full balance to the mind and body for increased health
 To develop strong self-defense capabilities

8 Martial Arts

Oom Yung Doe schools claim to train in eight different martial arts taught as one. These are listed as the following eight styles of martial arts:
 Hap Ki Do / Ai Ki Do
 Kong Su / Tae Kwon Do
 Udo / Ju Jitsu
 Kom Do / Samurai
 Kung Fu
 Tai Chi
 Bagwa Chung
 Ship Pal Gae

Tournaments

Movement taught by a master is often demonstrated in a tournament. In tournaments, practitioners demonstrate movement and self-defense ability, and are judged based on:
 Strength
 Correctly connecting movements
 Speed
 Coordination
 Balance
 Accuracy
 Focus (eyes)
 Top body movement
 Middle body movement
 Lower body movement

Acupressure and herbal equipment

Herbal formulas and acupressure points are an essential part of Oom Yung Doe practice. Herbal formulas used by practitioners are said to improve circulation and remove toxins from the body, and some movements taught within the school are designed to stimulate internal pressure points (similar to acupuncture).

Some critics have contended that the herbal equipment used in Oom Yung Doe represents little more than an additional revenue stream for the school. During an investigation for a news program, Steve Given and Allen Sayigh (respectively the dean of the School of Oriental Medicine and manager of the Chinese Herb Dispensary at Bastyr University) examined a set of dry herbal equipment sold for fifty dollars and concluded that "The entire bag couldn't be worth more than a couple dollars."

Medical benefits
Oom Yung Doe has been represented as a way to build health and longevity; students and instructors report increased physical health as a major benefit of Oom Yung Doe practice. Students report benefits such as strength, flexibility, increased energy level, and a general sense of well-being, as well as improvements in conditions such as asthma and diabetes. One study published in the Journal of Asian Martial Arts found that students practicing qi gong techniques taught within the school had significantly better lung capacity than the general population (20-25% greater for students 35 years and younger, and 30-45% greater for older students).

The school also teaches techniques designed to repair damage to the body. A retrospective study of 58 patients with herniated disks who had been treated by the school indicated significant improvement:

After 120 days, 90% of the patients had been completely free of back pain for 2 weeks; another 4% of patients had partial relief. These patients all had complete resolution of pain after 140-160 days of therapy.

All patients who had taken leave from work were able to return.

Uniforms and ranking

Beginning Oom Yung Doe practitioners are ranked into "sections" until reaching first degree black belt. Beginning students receive a white belt, sections of which are dyed black at each promotion until the rank of first degree black belt is achieved, at which point the entire belt is black. Higher-level instructors have a gold belt as part of their uniform trim, although their rank continues to be that of "nth degree black belt".

Oom Yung Doe instructors are likewise promoted through a series of instructor positions. Rank generally indicates skill and ability, while position generally indicates a practitioner's involvement with teaching. The two are independent, although there's a typical correspondence between them as indicated on the chart on the right.

All Oom Yung Doe practitioners wear standardized uniforms while practicing in the school. Students and beginning instructors wear white uniforms, and main instructors and higher-level practitioners wear black uniforms. Practitioners at 3rd degree black belt and below wear Korean-style uniforms similar to Karategi. 4th degree black belts and above wear Chinese-style ("Kung Fu") uniforms which button together at the front (similar to a button-down shirt).

Legal Proceedings

1989: Allegations of violating the Consumer Fraud Act in Illinois
In 1989, the Attorney General for the State of Illinois filed charges against the school. What was alleged in this complaint was that John C. Kim and five other instructors “violated the Consumer Fraud Act....by inducing Illinois consumers, through fraud, coercion and breach of fiduciary duty, to pay sums of money in excess of $2,500.00 per year for physical fitness services, failing to give consumers copies of contracts signed for these services, failing to notify consumers of their three day right to cancel said contracts, and coercing consumers into signing contracts for increasingly expensive courses...”. This began a legal battle which continued until 1994, when the case was ended without trial—the parties entered into a consent decree in which the defendants did not admit wrongdoing or misconduct, but did agree to abide by the laws governing businesses associated with physical fitness, and did pay $4,000 to the State Project and Court Ordered Distribution Fund for Consumer Enforcement and Education.

1995: Conviction for tax conspiracy
In April 1995, Kim and thirteen other instructors were arraigned to federal court for conspiracy to defraud the United States IRS. In contrast to the crime of tax fraud (which requires an "overt act" of fraud), the charge of conspiracy requires only that defendants had discussed or planned activities which, if carried out, would have been fraudulent. Kim and four other defendants were found guilty of conspiracy on December 6, 1996. The court estimated that the conspiracy withheld or planned to withhold $2,172,800.00 in taxes. The four defendants were sentenced to five years in prison and Kim was fined $2,550.00 and sentenced to five years in prison. He was released on April 13, 2001.

Other Controversies
Media reports and critics of the school have at various times accused the schools of unethical behavior and of exaggerated claims of the value of the training.

Kim's claims of achievement
John C. Kim claims to have competed in and won the All Asia Championship (Chung Dong Yang Moo Sul Yun Moo Dae Hwey) in 1956 in the Cho Leung area of Pusan. Internal Oom Yung Doe literature lists Wang Po as the sponsor of the tournament, and Yang Chou Fai, Wang Sei Kau, and Hwan Byung Quan as the presiding judges. Also said to be in attendance were Mok Jing Quan, Chae Jung Su, Park Hyun Su, Yu Gee Han, Chil Sung, and Park Yung-Gil. This claim has attracted criticism. Nam Tae Hi, one of the founders of modern Taekwondo who ran a competing school in Chicago at the time, made a statement to a reporter investigating Kim's claims indicating that becoming champion of all Asia in the 1950s was "Not possible."

Another achievement claimed by Kim is a technique he refers to as "Kyong Gong Sul Bope" (경공술법 or flying side kick) which he claims to have demonstrated by jumping from the equivalent of an 11-story building. While in the U.S. in 1972, Kim claims to have again performed the Kyong Gong Sul Bope movement by jumping from the equivalent of an 8-story building and landing without injury on a sloped surface.

Some critics accuse Kim of falsifying these claims and promoting outlandish legends of his abilities.

Cost of Training
Critics have charged that the school's training is overpriced and that students are pressured to pay exorbitant amounts of money for additional courses or seminars of questionable value. Even some critics of the school, however, acknowledge that the rigorous training includes valuable self-defense skills, and students report further benefits such as greatly improved health and even recovery from injury and illness. One student described the training as "like paying for therapy and personal trainers and a gym and all of that stuff rolled into one", and another said that Oom Yung Doe charges "twice what other [schools] charge. But what they teach there is 10 times more than what they teach at other schools."

References

External links
 

Hybrid martial arts
North American martial arts
Articles containing video clips